The Southern, Kolyma or Forest Yukaghir language is one of two extant Yukaghir languages.

Last spoken in the forest zone near the sources of the Kolyma, divided between the Sakha Republic and the Magadan Oblast (around ), previously in the wider area of the upper Kolyma region. In 2010 it had about 10 active speakers.

Status 
, Kolyma Yukaghir is a moribund language, with only 50 remaining speakers with the language as their mother tongue. No speakers are monolingual, since all speak Russian and most speak Yakut. The first language for all Yukaghir under 60 is Russian, although many still have Kolyma Yukaghir as a mother tongue, and the average age for fluent, first-language speakers is 63 or more. In the past, multilingualism was common in the region, and Kolyma Yukaghir, Yakut, Even, and Chukchi all served as languages of intercultural communication, depending on the ethnicity of the addressee. Yukaghirs 60 and older follow this custom. Middle-aged Yukaghir, from 41–60, still have Yukaghir as their mother tongue and speak to elders in it, although they use Russian for all other communication. The youngest generation of Yukaghir is almost entirely monolingual in Russian, the only language used at school. Although Kolyma Yukaghir has been taught at school since 1985, the youngest generation still know little to none of the language.

Classification and grammatical features
The relationship of the Yukaghir languages with other language families is uncertain, though it has been suggested that they are distantly related to the Uralic languages, thus forming the putative Uralic–Yukaghir language family.

Kolyma and Tundra Yukaghir are the only two remnants of what used to be one of the dominant language families of northeastern Siberia, spreading from the River Anadyr in the east to the River Lena in the west. On the basis of the evidence of early sources, it can be assumed that there existed a Yukaghir dialect continuum, with what is today Kolyma Yukaghir and Tundra Yukaghir at the extremes.

Kolyma Yukaghir and Tundra Yukaghir are not mutually intelligible. Both Yukaghir languages have residual vowel harmony and a complex phonotactics of consonants, rich agglutinative morphology and are strictly head-final. They has practically no finite subordination and very few coordinate structures. Yukaghir has a split intransitive alignment system based on discourse-pragmatic features. In absence of narrow focus, the system is organised on a nominative–accusative basis; when focused, direct objects and subjects of intransitive verbs are co-aligned (special focus case, special focus agreement).

Writing System

Phonology 
All charts are from Maslova (2003).

Vowels 

Kolyma Yukaghir demonstrates contrastive vowel length.

Consonants 

Kolyma Yukaghir has a glottal stop, but only as a marginal phoneme in some interjections (ex. maʔ: "take!").

[b, x, ɣ, ç, ʝ] occur as allophones of /w, q, ʁ, tɕ, dʑ/.

When a labial approximant /w/ occurs at the end of a word, it is pronounced as a [u].

When a velar nasal /ŋ/ occurs before a voiced uvular fricative /ʁ/, it becomes a voiced uvular stop [ɢ].

The phonemes /(s) (z)/ only occur in Russian loanwords.

Sample 
An interlinear glossed sample:
Yarqadan
Recorded by Ljudmila Zhukova from Ljubov' Demina in 1988.
  
"From the bottom of the mountains, from the whiteness of the ice our mother Yarqadan quietly carries its shining water downstream."

References 
Notes

Bibliography
 Vakhtin, N. B. 1991. The Yukaghir language in Sociolinguistic Perspective. Steszew, Poland: International Institute of Ethnolinguistic and Oriental Studies.
 Krejnovich, Eruhim A., Jukagirskij jazyk. Moscow / Leningrad: Nauka (1958).
 Maslova, Elena, A Grammar of Kolyma Yukaghir, Mouton Grammar Library, 27 (2003).
 Maslova, Elena, Tundra Yukaghir, LINCOM Europa. Languages of the World/Materials 372 (2003).

External links 
 Southern Yukaghir at Glottopedia
 The Yukaghir Languages
 Online Documentation of Kolyma (Southern) Yukaghir
 Bibliography

Agglutinative languages
Endangered languages
Languages of Russia
Subject–object–verb languages
Southern